Austrodrillia saxea is a species of sea snail, a marine gastropod mollusk in the family Horaiclavidae.

It was formerly included within the family Turridae, the turrids.

Description
The length of the shell attains 7 mm, its diameter 3 mm. The color of the shell shows an infrasutural spiral row of brown spots between the axial plicae, spirally elongate. On the body whorl are three faint continuous spiral brown bands, and very faint curved axial bands.<ref>[https://archive.org/details/transactionspro331909roya  Verco, J.C. 1909. Notes on South Australian marine Mollusca with descriptions of new species. Part XII; Transactions of the Royal Society of South Australia v. 33 (1909)]</ref>

Distribution
This marine species is endemic to Australia and occurs off New South Wales, South Australia, Tasmania and Victoria.

References

 Sowerby, G.B., III. (1896) List of the Pleurotomidae of South Australia, with descriptions of some new species. Proceedings of the Malacological Society of London, 2, 24–32, pl. 3
 Hedley, C. 1922. A revision of the Australian Turridae. Records of the Australian Museum 13(6): 213–359, pls 42–56 
 May, W.L. 1923. An Illustrated Index of Tasmanian Shells: with 47 plates and 1052 species. Hobart : Government Printer 100 pp.
 Wells, F.E. 1990. Revision of the recent Australian Turridae referred to the genera Splendrillia and Austrodrillia. Journal of the Malacological Society of Australasia 11: 73–117
 Wilson, B. 1994. Australian Marine Shells. Prosobranch Gastropods.'' Kallaroo, WA : Odyssey Publishing Vol. 2 370 pp.

External links
  Tucker, J.K. 2004 Catalog of recent and fossil turrids (Mollusca: Gastropoda). Zootaxa 682:1–1295

saxea
Gastropods of Australia